Francis George Atkinson (1874  – 6 December 1902) was the first district officer in Jesselton at British North Borneo.

Life and career 

Atkinson was the second son of the Rev. F. H. Atkinson of Jersey and Mrs Mary Edith Atkinson. He was born in 1874 and educated at Victoria College, Jersey (Channel Islands).

After experiencing some time in Australia, he joined the Borneo service in March 1898 and was appointed to be District Officer, Jesselton in January 1901. Mr. Atkinson was popular among the government and his colleagues. He was fondly known as "West Coast Atky"

Death 

Following an attack of malaria fever on 4 December, Atkinson suffered a heart failure and died in Jesselton on 6 December at the age of 28. His death in December 1902 was officially announced in The Straits Times newspaper on 10 January 1903. The British North Borneo Herald pays the following tribute to his memory:

His mother Mrs Mary Edith Atkinson had presented a two-faced clock to Jesselton town as a tribute to the memory of her son and it was decided later that a clock tower would be built in his honor. The Atkinson Clock Tower was commissioned on 20 April 1905.

References 

1874 births
1902 deaths
People educated at Victoria College, Jersey
British North Borneo
Administrators in British Borneo